Sandra Spencer (born 1973) is a British actress, singer, and television presenter.

She studied opera under Peter Firmani, and trained as an actress at the Academy Drama School in London.

Her theatre work includes Adriana in The Comedy of Errors at Shakespeare's Globe and Brenda in The Brothers at the Hackney Empire.

On television, she has presented Channel 4's Love Hub and the cult Midlands cable TV music magazine show The Zone.

Her film roles include Sandy in Sarjit Bains' Triads, Yardies and Onion Bhajees, which won a minor award at the Cannes Film Festival in 2003 and was named Film of the Festival at the Bite The Mango Film Festival.

Spencer also played Kendra in Beautiful People (2003) and the Vicar in Echoes of War (2003), which won Best Film at the Screen Nation Awards.

She is a former advertising manager on Renewable Energy World at PennWell Publishing.

External links

1973 births
Living people
British actresses
Alumni of the Academy Drama School
21st-century British  women singers
British women television presenters